Spitz an der Donau is a market town in the district of Krems-Land in the Austrian state of Lower Austria, in the midst of the UNESCO World Heritage area Wachau, further down from Willendorf on the left bank of the Danube.  The ferry across the Danube here is interesting in that it has no motor or sail: it is powered by rudder set against the river current, anchored to a cable above the river.  The ferry carries passengers, bicycles, motorcycles, and automobiles.

History
Occupied since Celtic times, it was first mentioned in 830. A hill "Tausendeimerberg" (the "Hill of a Thousand Buckets") is so named because of the many grapes that grow there, for the Wachau valley, for which Spitz is in, is famous for them. The Late Gothic church to St. Maurice is famous for its Apostles (1380) and an altarpiece by Kremser Schmidt. To the south of Spitz is the famous fortress of Hinterhaus.

In February 2008, Spitz made an appearance in domestic news following the poisoning of then–mayor Dr. Hannes Hirtzberger.

Population

Geography
Spitz lies on the left bank of the Danube in the Waldviertel in Lower Austria. The area of the market town covers 23.83 square kilometers. 69.21 percent of the area is forested. In Spitz, the Spitzer stream flows into the Danube

Partner City
Since 2006, Spitz and "Taufkirchen an der Pram", located in the Upper Austrian district of Schärding, have been partner communities. Meetings and visits in all areas of daily life contribute to the strengthening of the partnership.

External links
 http://www.planetware.com/austria/spitz-a-n-spitz.htm

References 

Cities and towns in Krems-Land District